Miroslav Giuchici may refer to:

 Miroslav Giuchici (footballer, born 1954), Romanian football midfielder
 Miroslav Giuchici (footballer, born 1980), Romanian football striker